Hồ Văn Trung (1984 – 2 November 2019) was one of only 29 known people in medical history to reach a height of 8 feet (244 cm) or more. He had a standing height of at least 8 ft 5.25 in (257.2 cm), placing him as the 6th tallest man in history.

Early life 
Hồ Văn Trung was born in Ca Mau in 1984 and was the first of four children. Due to his family being poor his parents had to make a living selling coconuts, which was not enough to cover the family's living expenses. Later, Trung moved to Viên An Đông commune, Ngọc Hiển district and worked as a shrimp farmer in order to financially support his family.

Later life 
According to Trung's family, he was 5 ft 7 in (170 cm) at age of 17 when he developed a fever which persisted for a prolonged period of time. After the fever, he experienced abnormal growth in height. At year 2014 he grew up to 7 ft 8.5 in (235 cm) tall and weighing 110 kg (244 pounds). Doctors attributed his growth to a pituitary gland disease. In 2018 he went to hospital due to kidney failure, by the time he was about 8 ft 2.5 in (250 cm), although he has descalated knee, and was still growing. His coffin measured 10 ft 0 in (304.8 cm). The men who made his coffin said his final height was 9 ft 0.25 in (275 cm) tall which if true would make him taller than Robert Wadlow.

References 

1984 births
2019 deaths
Deaths from bowel obstruction
People from Cà Mau Province
People with gigantism
World record holders